Stephen Vincent Maney (October 14, 1886 – March 13, 1952) was an American Major League Baseball shortstop who played in one game for the Detroit Tigers on May 18, . Maney was one of several replacement players that the Tigers played that day after the regular Tigers players went on strike to protest the suspension of star center fielder Ty Cobb.

Maney was working at the Iroquois Iron Works in Philadelphia when he was recruited to play for the Tigers for one day against the Philadelphia A's.  He later wrote to his brother:

"I played shortstop and had more fun than you can imagine.  Of course it was a big defeat for us, but they paid us fifteen dollars for a couple of hours work and I was satisfied to say that I had played against the world champions.  I had three putouts, three assists, one error, and no hits."

Maney also walked once and was hit by a pitch in the 24-2 defeat. For many years, he was listed in baseball records as "Pat Meaney"; his real identity was established by baseball researcher Bill Dougherty, and Vince Maney's real name is now listed in official baseball records.

References

External links

1886 births
1952 deaths
Detroit Tigers players
Major League Baseball shortstops
Baseball players from New York (state)
Marion Glass Blowers players
Columbus Senators players
San Francisco (minor league baseball) players
Toledo Mud Hens players
San Francisco Seals (baseball) players
Montreal Royals players
Little Rock Travelers players
Charleston Sea Gulls players
Fayetteville Highlanders players